Erlin may refer to:

Places 
Erlin, Changhua, a township in Taiwan
Erlin, Ohio, an unincorporated community in the United States

People 
Robbie Erlin (born 1990), American baseball pitcher
Erlin Geffrard (born 1987), artist and musician